A geologic preliminary investigation is a survey of the subsoil conducted by an engineering geologist in conjunction with a civil engineer.  Typically, the footprint of the structure is established on the proposed building site and trenches up to fourteen feet deep are dug both outside, and more importantly, inside, the proposed footprint using the bucket-end of a backhoe.  In extreme cases, a larger, more powerful tracked excavator is used.  The geologist is looking for potential failure planes, expansive clays, excessive moisture, potential for proper compaction, and other variables that go into the construction of a solid foundation (such as potential for liquefaction).  Materials are also gathered to determine the maximum compaction value (a "proctor") of the subsurface.  Prelims should always be conducted prior to the construction of any permanent structure.

Building engineering
Geotechnical investigations